The 2013 Belgian Grand Prix (formally known as the 2013 Formula 1 Shell Belgian Grand Prix) was a Formula One motor race on 25 August 2013 at the Circuit de Spa-Francorchamps, near the village of Francorchamps, Wallonia, Belgium. It was the eleventh round of the 2013 season, and the 69th running of the Belgian Grand Prix.

The race was won by Sebastian Vettel in a Red Bull-Renault in a time of 1:23:42, registering an average speed of 220.80 km/h, thus extending his championship lead to 46 points. Second was Fernando Alonso in a Ferrari, and third was Lewis Hamilton (who had started from pole) in a Mercedes.
This was the first of 9 straight victories for Vettel, a Formula One record.

Report

Background
Like the 2012 Belgian Grand Prix, tyre supplier Pirelli brought its orange-banded hard compound tyre as the harder "prime" tyre and the white-banded medium compound tyre as the softer "option" tyre.

Qualifying

Mercedes had taken 7 of the last 8 poles, but in practice, Red Bull had appeared to be the fastest team. A rain shower hit the track right before qualifying got underway, dropping the air temperature to only 22 °C and mixing things up even further.

All the drivers started the session with intermediates, Lewis Hamilton set the first benchmark of 2:07.008. As the track continued drying, Nico Rosberg, Mark Webber, and Sebastian Vettel all hit the front briefly. After the midpoint, most drivers pitted for a new set of intermediate tyres while Giedo van der Garde took a gamble to switch onto the slicks. As times passing by, lap times improved rapidly, nearly pushed both Ferraris out of Q2. But Fernando Alonso managed to set the fastest time at the last moment and his team-mate Felipe Massa also made it into the next session. Van der Garde's decision proved a big success, for he impressively finished 3rd. In fact, three of the four drivers from Caterham and Marussia squeezed into Q2, the only one that failed to do so was Charles Pic, who started the race from the last place on the grid. Also eliminated were the Williams duo, the two Toro Rossos, and the Sauber of Esteban Gutiérrez.

At the beginning of the 15 minutes period, drivers were divided into 2 groups, most of them used mediums, while several others including Webber and Alonso chose the hards. In the opening phase, Webber and Alonso were fighting for the top spot, their gap being merely two thousandths of a second. At the same time, Vettel and Hamilton stayed in the pits until there were about 7 minutes left on the board. After that it was time for mediums, first the two Lotuses, then Sebastian Vettel, all challenging for the first place. But finally Kimi Räikkönen put the fight to an end with a 1:48.296. Eliminated in Q2 were Sauber's Nico Hülkenberg, Force India's Adrian Sutil, McLaren's Sergio Pérez, Caterham's Giedo van der Garde who achieved the team's best qualifying result ever, and both the Marussias.

In fear of the incoming shower, all bar Paul di Resta queued at the pit exit with medium tyres. However just moments later, the Force India driver opted to use the inters. It soon turned out that the latter was right, as the other 9 drivers didn't even start a flying lap as the track was too wet for slicks and they had to pit immediately. Di Resta then set the fastest lap time, with Felipe Massa in second. Just when it looked like he was going to take his maiden pole position, the track started to dry out. As there was 3 minutes left, Räikkönen gave the first shot to come to 3rd, ahead of Alonso. And Rosberg behind them posted a 2:02.251 to take the provisional pole. But none of them could cross the line before the chequered flag. With the ever-improving track, polesitter would be decided among three that still had one timed lap to go—Webber, Vettel, and Hamilton. Webber finished first to reduce the quickest time by almost a second. Then Vettel beat his teammate by a further one tenth of a second, Lewis Hamilton subsequently secured his fourth successive pole. The Lotuses and the Ferraris had to settle in rows 4 and 5.

Race

Mark Webber suffered clutch problems right from the start and fell from third to sixth after one lap. On the other hand, Jenson Button and Fernando Alonso both enjoyed a great getaway, running in fourth and fifth places respectively. Sebastian Vettel had a great run up Eau Rouge and overtook pole-sitter Lewis Hamilton down Kemmel Straight on the first lap and quickly took a commanding lead over the Mercedes duo. Alonso and Webber both passed Button and the Spaniard continued to fight his way up the field, overtaking Nico Rosberg for third place. Kimi Räikkönen was also working his way up the field, but excessive brake dust was coming out of the Finn's left front wheel at an early stage in the race.

On the eighth lap, Sergio Pérez was handed a drive through penalty for forcing Romain Grosjean off the track. As a result, Grosjean had to straightline Les Combes and fell from eight to tenth as Felipe Massa took advantage. Räikkönen's brakes ultimately failed as the Finn went off massively at the Chicane, nearly collecting Massa in the process. The Lotus driver retired the car, which meant that his record run of consecutive points finishes ended at 27. It was later discovered that a loose visor tear-off got stuck inside the left front brake duct, causing the disc to overheat. After the first round of pit stops, Hamilton successfully retained second place from Alonso, but the latter quickly found his way through.

Further down the order, a battle involving Esteban Gutiérrez, Pastor Maldonado and the Force India duo was raging. As the four cars were approaching the final chicane, the young Mexican successfully made his move on both Adrian Sutil and Maldonado. The German tried to follow, but clipped the Williams driver's front wing. Maldonado dove for the pits only to collect the second Force India of Paul di Resta. As a result, the Venezuelan had to pit for a new front wing and received a ten seconds stop-and-go penalty while di Resta retired his car on the spot.

Vettel won the race, ahead of Alonso and Hamilton. Nico Rosberg successfully fought off Webber for fourth, finishing less than three seconds behind his teammate. Button took sixth for McLaren, while the race-long scrap between Massa and Grosjean ended with the Brazilian in front for seventh. Sutil and Daniel Ricciardo took ninth and tenth respectively.

Classification

Qualifying

Race

Championship standings after the race

Drivers' Championship standings

Constructors' Championship standings

 Note: Only the top five positions are included for both sets of standings.

Greenpeace protest
Greenpeace used the Belgian Grand Prix as a main point of protests against Shell, a principal sponsor of the race. Greenpeace activists went to the track and put up a number of banners protesting against Shell drilling in the Arctic. These included two remote controlled banners which scrolled up in front of the podium celebrations, which were quickly disposed of by security, and a large banner on the main grandstand. The official world feed broadcast did not show any banner in detail.

See also 
 2013 Spa-Francorchamps GP2 Series round
 2013 Spa-Francorchamps GP3 Series round

References

External links

Belgian
Grand Prix
Belgian Grand Prix
August 2013 sports events in Europe